Dressing Up may refer to:

Dressing up: Disguise
Trick-or-treating

Music
"Dressing Up", a song by the Cure from their album The Top
"Dressin' Up", a song by Katy Perry